Biagio Conte (born 7 April 1968 in Palermo) is an Italian former professional cyclist, who competed professionally from 1996 to 2003. He currently works as a directeur sportif for UCI Continental team .

Major results

1991
 1st Trofeo Zsšdi
 1st Stage 8 Peace Race
1993
 1st Trofeo Zsšdi
1994
 5th Gran Premio della Liberazione
1995
 1st Giro del Belvedere
 1st Trofeo Città di Castelfidardo
 3rd Gran Premio Industria e Commercio Artigianato Carnaghese
1996
 Vuelta a España
1st Stages 1 & 14
 1st Stage 4 Trofeo dello Stretto
 2nd Gran Premio della Costa Etruschi
 3rd Trofeo Città di Castelfidardo
 6th Giro dell'Etna
1997
 1st Gran Premio della Costa Etruschi
 1st Giro dell'Etna
 2nd Coppa Ugo Agostoni
 3rd Alassio Cup
 3rd Milan–San Remo
 3rd Giro del Piemonte
 4th Overall Giro di Puglia
 5th Trofeo Pantalica
 6th Grand Prix de Wallonie
 7th Paris–Tours
 9th Trofeo Laigueglia
1998
 2nd Grand Prix Pino Cerami
 5th Rund um den Henninger Turm
 9th Giro del Piemonte
1999
 2nd Grand Prix Pino Cerami
 4th Overall Circuit de Lorraine
1st Stage 2
2000
 1st Stage 15 Giro d'Italia
 3rd Trofeo Luis Puig
 7th Grand Prix of Aargau Canton
2001
 1st Stage 1 Tirreno–Adriatico
 Regio-Tour
1st Stages 1 & 5
 2nd Giro di Campania
 4th Milan–San Remo
 6th Trofeo Luis Puig
2003
 2nd Giro dell'Etna

Grand Tour general classification results timeline

References

External links

1968 births
Living people
Italian male cyclists
Sportspeople from Palermo
Cyclists from Sicily